This article is a list of historic places in Central Alberta entered on the Canadian Register of Historic Places, whether they are federal, provincial, or municipal.

List

See also 

Central Alberta